The Road of the Llamas or El Camino de las llamas is a 1942 Argentine film directed by Mario Soffici.

Cast
Pepita Serrador
Elisa Galvé
Roberto Airaldi
José Olarra
César Blasco
Rafael Falcón
María Herrero
Vicente Padula
Pepito Petray
Froilán Varela
Jorge Villoldo

External links
 
Some 70 set photographs of The Road of the Llamas

1942 films
1940s Spanish-language films
Argentine black-and-white films
1942 drama films
Films directed by Mario Soffici
Argentine drama films
1940s Argentine films